Hahncappsia praxitalis is a moth in the family Crambidae. It was described by Herbert Druce in 1895. It is found in Mexico (Jalapa, Veracruz), Guatemala and Costa Rica.

References

Moths described in 1895
Pyraustinae